Pennsylvania House of Representatives District 164 includes part of Delaware County. It is currently represented by Democrat Jennifer O'Mara.

District profile
The district includes the following areas:

Delaware County:

 Marple Township (PART)
Ward 04 [PART, Division 02]
Ward 05
Ward 06
Ward 07
 Media
 Morton
 Springfield Township
 Swarthmore
 Upper Providence Township

Representatives

Recent election results

References

External links
District map from the United States Census Bureau
Pennsylvania House Legislative District Maps from the Pennsylvania Redistricting Commission.  
Population Data for District 44 from the Pennsylvania Redistricting Commission.

Government of Delaware County, Pennsylvania
165